The Men's Greco-Roman 55 kg is a competition featured at the 2021 European Wrestling Championships, and was held in Warsaw, Poland on April 23 and April 24.

Medalists

Results 
 Legend
 F — Won by fall

Main Bracket

Repechage

References

External links
Draw

Men's greco-roman 55 kg